The Sri Lanka Signals Corps (SLSC) (Sinhalese: ශ්‍රී ලංකා සංඥා බලකාය Shri Lanka Sana Balakaya) is a combat support corps of the Sri Lanka Army, responsible for providing military communications, information technology and electronic warfare support. The corps is made up of a signals brigade, ten regular regiments and one volunteer regiment. It is responsible for installing, maintaining and operating all types of telecommunications equipment and information systems. It is headquartered at the Panagoda Cantonment.

Colonel Commandant of the SL Signals and Chief Signal Officer of the Sri Lanka Army is Major General HMLD Herath RSP USP psc. Brigadier BI Assalaratchi USP psc is Commander Signals Brigade, operationally in charge of all units and sub-units in the field.

The flag and cap badge feature Mercury, the winged messenger of the gods, who is referred to by members of the corps as "Jimmy".

History
Established on October 19, 1943, as a part of the Ceylon Defence Force it was reformed as a troop of signals February 9, 1950 following the formation of the Ceylon Army in 1949. The initial task of this troop was to provide communications between Army HQ and its branches. In 1949, the Volunteer Signals unit was commanded by Lt Col CR De Silva. By the end of 1950 this troop had 1 Officer and 17 other ranks and their tasks included establishing a signals office at Army HQ, provision of a signal dispatch service, manning a switch board and the construction and maintenance of underground as well as field cables. In May 1951 another Signals Office was established in Diyatalawa to serve the Garrison HQ which was just formed at that time. By October 1, 1951, the troop was raised to a squadron with a strength of 4 officers and 142 other ranks.

In 1951 formal approval was granted to wear the Royal Signals badges with the additional scroll "CEYLON" on it and to adopt the Royal Signals march Begone Dull Care as the regimental march of the Ceylon Signals Corps and in 1959 the 1st Regiment of the Ceylon Signals was formed with Lt Col DV Brohier was appointed as its first Commanding Officer. In 1962 following the attempted military coup the 2nd volunteer signal regiment was disbanded and its remaining personnel transferred to form the National Service Regiment (NSR).

In 1972 with Sri Lanka proclaiming itself a republic, the Corps was renamed as the Sri Lanka Signals Corps. In 1980 a new Volunteer squadron was raised. The Corps has expanded to a level of a Signals Brigade with integral signals units under HQ Chief Signal Officer at the highest level of command in performing the classic role. The Signals Corps provides support to the combat and support arms by providing communications, electronic warfare and information technology support in the battle field and at the rear. All these signal units and sub-units administratively come under the aegis of the Regimental Centre located at Army Cantonment, Panagoda.

Organization 

The corps also runs a School of Signals in Kandy, established on 15 July 1991. The school is currently under the command of Col SJKD Jayawardena USP psc, with Major KVA Kodikara psc serving as chief instructor. The Sri Lanka Army established a Directorate of Information Technology under the Signal Corps on 1 March 2010; its current director is Major General P A J Peiris ndu.

Independent Signal Squadron
AHQ Independent Signal Squadron
Independent Composite Signal Squadron
EW Squadron 
PA Squadron
LED Squadron

Past command staff

Centre Commandants

Colonel Commandants

Notable officers 
Lieutenant Colonel Gotabhaya Rajapaksa, RWP, RSP - President of Sri Lanka
Lieutenant Colonel DV Brohier - First Commanding Officer, Ceylon Signals Corps
Lieutenant Colonel Basil R. Jesudasan - former Commanding Officer, 2nd Volunteer Signals, Ceylon Signals Corps & accused conspirator in the 1962 coup d'état attempt
Major General Piyal Abeysekera (also known as E.P. de Z. Abeysekera) USP, MSc - former Deputy Chief of Staff of Sri Lanka Army
Major General W.J.T.K. Fernando psc - former CO, 1SLSC
Major General C.J. Abayaratna VSV, USP - 1st Colonel Commandant, SLSC, former Signals Brigade Commander & former CO, 1SLSC
Major General A.M.C.W.B. Senewiratne VSV, USP, psc - 4th Colonel Commandant, SLSC & former CO, 3 SLSC
Major General Y.S.A. de Silva USP - 5th Colonel Commandant, SLSC, former Signals Brigade Commander & former CO 4 SLSC
Major General Tuan Fadyl Meedin RSP, Ldmc - 6th Colonel Commandant, SLSC, 1st Chief Signals Officer (CSO), Chief Innovations Officer (CIO), Signals Brigade Commander, Chief Controller- Centre for Research & Development (MOD), Centre Commandant & former CO- 1 SLSC
Major General K.A.W.S. Ratnayake ndu - 10th Chief Signal Officer - Sri Lanka Army, 16th Regimental Commander and Colonel Commandant - SLSC

Alliances
 - Royal Corps of Signals

Order of precedence

Abbreviation
 CSO - Chief Signal Officer
 PWV- Parama Weera Vibhushanaya
 WV - Weerodara Vibhushanaya
 WWV - Weera Wickrama Vibhushanaya
 RWP - Rana Wickrama Padakkama
 RSP - Rana Sura Padakkama
 VSV - Vishista Sewa Vibhushanaya
 USP -Utthama Seva Padakkama
 psc - passed staff college
 ndu - national defense university
 IT - Information Technology
 CS - Cyber Security
 CT - Communication Technology

References

External links
 Sri Lanka Army
 Sri Lanka Signals Corps

Signals Corps
Signals Corps
Military communications
Military units and formations of Ceylon in World War II